Ribonuclease P4 is an enzyme. This enzyme catalyses the following chemical reaction

 Endonucleolytic cleavage of RNA, removing 3'-extranucleotides from tRNA precursor

References

External links 

EC 3.1.26